Nigeria competed at the 2009 World Championships in Athletics from 15 to 23 August 2009. A team of 25 athletes was announced in preparation for the competition. The selected athletes had achieved one of the competition's qualifying standards.

The team won no medals; its best result was the 6th-place finish by the women's 4x400 meter relay team.

Team selection

Track and road events

Field and combined events

References
Entry list. European Athletic Association (2009-07-30). Retrieved on 2009-08-16.

External links
Official competition website

Nations at the 2009 World Championships in Athletics
World Championships in Athletics
Nigeria at the World Championships in Athletics